"Livin' Thing" is a song written by Jeff Lynne and performed by Electric Light Orchestra (ELO). It appears on ELO's 1976 album A New World Record and was also released as a single. Patti Quatro sang uncredited vocals, particularly the "higher and higher" parts.

In August 2006, "Livin' Thing" was named by the UK's Q as the number 1 "Guilty Pleasure" single of all time – a list designed to celebrate "uncool" but excellent records, and which received considerable publicity. The original single had the bonus of having "Fire On High" on the flip side, a tune that became the band's most popular instrumental piece. The UK version was released in a blue vinyl format.

Critical reception
AllMusic's writer Stewart Mason described the song structure: "[it] opens with a mock-Spanish orchestral flourish before swinging into a more typical mid-tempo ELO rocker, driven by a battery of acoustic rhythm guitars on the verses and modulating upwards into a falsetto Jeff Lynne vocal on a chorus that’s powered by an even more prominent than usual contribution from the group's string section", adding that it lacks "that impossible-to-dislodge hook that typified Lynne's most successful songs from this era, but it's still a darn sight better than most of what was at the top of the charts in late 1976".  Los Angeles Times critic Robert Hilburn called it an "extremely catchy record that has all the vocal and instrumental hooks to keep you listening."

Ultimate Classic Rock critic Michael Gallucci rated it ELO's 2nd best song, specifically praising the "string-solo opening, soulful backing vocals, synth waves occasionally crashing into the chorus and a gigantic hook."

Billboard said that it "moves through a dark U.K. rock distillation into a soaring, ethereal chorale and a return to the minor-key mode. Cash Box said that "a diabolical arrangement hits hard along with some ever ready harmonies which sew this record up into sure hit potential." Record World called it a "Jeff Lynne masterwork" and said that "a savory rock sound makes it happen."

Charts

Weekly charts

Year-end charts

Certifications

Jeff Lynne version
Jeff Lynne re-recorded the song in his own home studio. It was released in a compilation album with other re-recorded ELO songs, under the ELO name.

Covers
In 2001, PFR covered the track on the album Lynne Me Your Ears – A Tribute to the Music of Jeff Lynne.

In 2004, The Beautiful South covered the track for their covers album Golddiggas, Headnodders and Pholk Songs. It reached number 24 on the UK charts and number 26 on the Irish charts.

Livin' Thing – CD1 (Sony Music UK; 6753711)
Livin' Thing [3:17]
I'm Living Good [4:00]

Livin' Thing – CD2 (Sony Music UK; 6753712)
Livin' Thing [3:17]
Lovin' You [2:53]
Another Night with the Boys [3:32]

Uses in other media
In 2017, "Livin' Thing" was featured in Telltale's Guardians of the Galaxy game. 

The 1997 feature film Boogie Nights includes the track for the final scene and end credits of the movie. Initially, Jeff Lynne refused to release the rights to the song, but changed his mind after viewing a screening of the film with director Paul Thomas Anderson and being impressed.

The song was featured in Cruella.

References

1976 songs
1976 singles
2004 singles
Electric Light Orchestra songs
The Beautiful South songs
Jet Records singles
Number-one singles in South Africa
Song recordings produced by Jeff Lynne
Songs written by Jeff Lynne
United Artists Records singles